F.C. Motagua is a Honduran professional football club based in Tegucigalpa, Honduras.  The club was founded in 1928.  Motagua currently plays in the Honduran Liga Nacional, the top tier of Honduran football.  They have not been out of the top tier since 1965, the year the league was inaugurated.  They have also been involved in CONCACAF football since they qualified to the CONCACAF Champions' Cup in 1969.

This list encompasses the major honours won by Motagua and records set by the club, their managers and their players.  The player records section includes details of the club's leading goalscorers and those who have made most appearances in first-team competitions.  It also records notable achievements by Motagua players on the international stage.

All stats accurate as of match played 30 November 2022.

Honours
F.C. Motagua is the second most successful club in Honduras having won 18 domestic leagues since the inauguration of the Honduran Liga Nacional in 1965–66.

Players

200+ Appearances

Top 10 scorers

List of Hat-tricks
Jairo Martínez possesses the record of most hat-tricks for the club with a total of four.  Denilson Costa remains as of today, the only player to score four goals in a single game for F.C. Motagua on 6 April 1997 against Independiente Villela.

League awards

 Top goalscorers
  Roberto Abrussezze – 16 goals in 1968–69
  Mario Blandón – 16 goals (shared) in 1973–74
  Mario Carreño – 10 goals in 1977–78
  Salvador Bernárdez – 15 goals in 1978–79
  Miguel Matthews – 8 goals (shared) in 1988–89
  Álex Ávila – 14 goals in 1994–95
  Geovanny Castro – 14 goals in 1995–96
  Denilson Costa – 13 goals in 1996–97
  Amado Guevara – 15 goals (shared) in 1997–98 C
  Jerry Bengtson – 15 goals in 2010–11 C
  Rubilio Castillo – 29 goals in 2014–15

 Best goalkeepers
  Salvador Dubois – 1970–71
  Roger Mayorga – 1973–74
  Roger Mayorga – 1974–75
  Alcides Morales – 1978–79
  Alcides Morales – 1981–82
  Marvin Henríquez – 1991–92
  Diego Vásquez – 1997–98 A
  Diego Vásquez – 1997–98 C
  Ricardo Canales – 2006–07 A
  Ricardo Canales – 2008–09 A
  Donaldo Morales – 2012–13
  Sebastián Portigliatti – 2014–15
  Jonathan Rougier – 2017–18
  Jonathan Rougier – 2018–19

Others
 Most goals scored in one season:
  Rubilio Castillo – 29 in 2014–15
 Goalkeeper with longest clean-sheet:
  Roger Mayorga – 838 minutes in 10 games in 1976
 First league scorer:
  Amado Castillo, 18 July 1965
 First Honduran Cup scorer:
 missing, 1968
 First Honduran Supercup scorer:
  Juan Coello, 13 January 1999
 First international competition scorer:
  Rubén Guifarro, 1 May 1969

Managerial records

 First ever coach:
  Daniel Bustillo – 1928
 Most successful coaches:
  Ramón Maradiaga – 4 leagues, 1 Honduran Supercup and 1 UNCAF Interclub Cup
  Diego Vásquez – 5 leagues and 1 Honduran Supercup
 Most consecutive games as coach:
  Diego Vásquez – 350 games (2014–2022)

League records

Team records

Matches

Others:
 Biggest domestic win: Motagua 7–0 Súper Estrella, 24 November 1991
 Biggest international win: Motagua 5–0 Juventus FC, 30 June 1993
 Biggest domestic defeat: Motagua 0–5 C.D.S. Vida, 23 October 1985. C.D. Marathón 5–0 Motagua, 6 April 2013. Real C.D. España 5–0 Motagua, 24 August 2014
 Biggest international defeat: Seattle Sounders FC 5–0 Motagua, 24 February 2022

Streaks
 Longest unbeaten runs:
 33 games from February 1973 to April 1974
 23 games from November 2011 to May 2012
 21 games from June 1998 to January 1999
 21 games from February 2017 to September 2017
 Best season starter:
 4 games won in 1973–74
 Longest winning streak:
 8 games from October to December 2018
 Longest win-less run:
 13 games from April 2001 to July 2001

Others
 Highest home attendance: 37,371 v C.D. Olimpia, 26 August 2000
 Highest away attendance: 38,256 v C.D. Olimpia, 17 December 2006
 Lowest home attendance: 0 v several
 Lowest away attendance: 0 v several

References

Records and statistics
Motagua